Phiaris obsoletana is a species of moth belonging to the family Tortricidae.

It is native to Europe.

References

Olethreutini